The Austrian Film Award, is the annual national film award of Austria, first given out in 2011. It is voted on by members of the Austrian Film Academy, which was founded in 2009 and consists of distinguished professionals from the Austrian film industry. The trophy was designed by media artist Valie Export.

The 2020 edition saw the drama Joy winning four awards, including the top prize for Best Fiction Film.

Categories
 Best Film: since 2011
 Best Director: since 2011
 Best Actor in a Leading Role: since 2011
 Best Actress in a Leading Role: since 2011
 Best Screenplay: Since 2011
 Best Cinematography: Since 2011
 Best Editing: Since 2011
 Best Production Design: Since 2011
 Best Costume Design: Since 2011
 Best Makeup: Since 2011
 Best Score: Since 2011
 Best Sound: 2011
 Best Documentary: Since 2011
 Best Short Film: Since 2013
 Best Actor in a Supporting Role: Since 2016
 Best Actress in a Supporting Role: Since 2016

Ceremonies

See also
 German Film Award
 Swiss Film Award

References

External links 
Official site (German)

Austrian film awards